Chavdar is a village in southwestern Bulgaria, located in the Dospat Municipality of the Smolyan Province.

Geography 
The village of Chavdar is located in the Western Rhodope Mountains. It is situated in the Chech region.

Religion 
The population is Muslim. Most inhabitants of the village are Pomaks.

Notes 

Villages in Smolyan Province
Chech